The Message to the Planet is a novel  by Iris Murdoch. Published in 1989, it was her twenty-fourth novel.

Plot
The Message to the Planet centres on Marcus Vallar, a charismatic former mathematician and painter who has abandoned both these pursuits, and on a group of London friends, former associates of Vallar, with whom he has broken off contact. The plot begins with the decision of Alfred Ludens, a young history professor, to seek out his former mentor Vallar in the hope that he can restore his friend Patrick Fenman to health. Fenman is apparently dying of a mysterious wasting disease and believes that his illness is the result of his having been cursed by Vallar.

Ludens finds Vallar living in the country with his daughter, a young woman named Irina. The three return to London, where, by a combination of physical manipulation and verbal exhortation, Vallar initiates Fenman's recovery. Ludens is convinced that Vallar is a brilliant philosopher and that it is his responsibility to  help Vallar to express his thoughts in writing, something he is reluctant or unable to do.  After a short period living in London, Irina arranges for her father to be admitted to Bellmain, an exclusive mental institution in the country near Salisbury Plain, where she will live with him in a cottage. Ludens is appalled by the suggestion that Vallar is mentally ill. He moves into a hotel in the nearby village and continues seeing Vallar daily in the hope of getting him to write, while trying to convince Irina, to whom he has become engaged, that Vallar should be removed from the institution.

Before long the story spreads that a healer who has raised a man from the dead is living at Bellmain. A group of new age travellers on their way to Stonehenge arrives, followed by others wishing to see him. Marcus Vallar begins making public appearances to his visitors, on whom he makes a strong impression of holiness. He also receives people asking for healing. However, he later renounces his position as a holy man.

The book's secondary plot concerns a ménage à trois involving the artist Jack Sheerwater, who had been Vallar's painting instructor, Jack's wife Franca, and his mistress Alison. Jack has had mistresses in the past, and has told Franca about them while assuring her that these extramarital relationships are temporary and insignificant. However, he decides that his relationship with Alison is to be permanent, and that all three should live together. Franca, still in love with Jack, acquiesces at first, but eventually she decides to leave him, as also does Alison. By the end of the novel Marcus Vallar has died, Ludens is no longer engaged to Irina, and Franca is still married to Jack, while Alison has left him.

Major themes
The Message to the Planet, Iris Murdoch's twenty-fourth novel, continues the exploration of some of the themes familiar from her earlier works. Marcus Vallar is a charismatic and masterful "enchanter" figure, a type featured in many of her novels. According to her biographer Peter J. Conradi, Iris Murdoch said that the character of Marcus Vallar was based on Georg Kreisel. Conradi also notes that Murdoch's seven last novels all deal with the death of a "wise older man", in this case Vallar. In common with other Murdoch novels, The Message to the Planet also explores the relationship between a master and his disciple, Vallar and Ludens respectively.

Two major themes more particular to this novel are the Holocaust and the "dilemma of the religious leader with power and his relationship to suffering". Vallar, who is Jewish, becomes obsessed with the suffering of the Jews, reads books about the Holocaust, and visits Auschwitz concentration camp. At the same time, several incidents and characteristics of Vallar recall the life of Jesus, including the apparently miraculous healing of Pat.

The subplot concerning the relationship among Franca, Jack and Alison highlights another characteristic Murdoch subject, the egoism and selfishness inherent in erotic love.

Literary significance and reception
Reaction to the novel was mixed, both by contemporary reviewers and by later critics and scholars. Anatole Broyard, an admirer of Murdoch's novels, wrote that after reading it "I still don't know whether it is a great novel, a merely interesting one, or an unclassifiable pandemonium". Another reviewer remarked that anyone "seeking an untroubled read and pat answers should seek them elsewhere".

In his study of Iris Murdoch's fiction, Peter Conradi wrote that The Message to the Planet was a "lesser" novel, inferior to its predecessor The Philosopher's Pupil, but with some memorable scenes. On the other hand, Suguna Ramanathan calls it "an extraordinary achievement" and "of all her 24 novels, the largest in scope and most powerful in thrust".

References

1989 British novels
Novels by Iris Murdoch
Chatto & Windus books